René Gérard was a French anti-Semitic propagandist.

In 1942, he became secretary general of the Institute for the Study of Jewish Questions, an anti-Semitic propaganda office subsidized by the Nazis.

References 

Possibly living people
Year of birth missing